Rosario-Victoria Bridge (in Spanish, Puente Rosario-Victoria) is the informal name of the physical connection between the Argentine cities of Rosario (province of Santa Fe) and Victoria (province of Entre Ríos).

This roadlink is composed of several bridges, viaducts and earth-filled sections. It crosses the main course of the Paraná River and touches down on several islands of the Paraná Delta in the way.

Works on the project began in 1998, but they were repeatedly interrupted due to lack of continued funding from the national and the provincial state, especially in the worst part of the Argentine economic crisis of 2001. Public transit access to the bridge was opened on May 22, 2003.

Among the materials used were about 250,000 cubic meters (326,987 yd³) of concrete, 63,000 tons of ADN-420 type steel, and 17,618 tons of asphalt. The access to the main bridge on the western side is in the northern border of Rosario, on the limit with the city of Granadero Baigorria. The official name of the main bridge (cable-stayed) is Nuestra Señora del Rosario (Our Lady of Rosario).

The project was executed by a private company (Puentes del Litoral S. A.), which was granted subsidies from the national state and the provincial states of Santa Fe and Entre Ríos, totalling about $385 million. The company received the operation and maintenance concession of the bridge for 25 years.

The southern Paraná is crossed by another cable-stayed bridge, the Zárate-Brazo Largo Bridge, joining Entre Ríos and Buenos Aires province.

See also

List of bridges

References

External links
 Rosario's tourism agency page on the bridge 
 RosarioTuristica.com.ar Puente-Rosario Victoria 
 A monograph on the bridge 
 Pictures of the bridge (Flickr search)
 

Cable-stayed bridges in Argentina
Transport in Rosario, Santa Fe
Buildings and structures in Entre Ríos Province
Buildings and structures in Santa Fe Province
Bridges completed in 2003
Bridges over the Paraná River